This is a list of notable Spanish artists who were born in or after 1300 and in or before 1500.

For artists born after 1500, see List of Spanish artists (born 1500–1800). For later artists, see List of Spanish artists.

Born 1350–1400 
Lluís Borrassà (1350–1424), painter
Bernardo Martorell (1400–1452), painter
Blasco de Grañén (1400–1459), painter
Luís Alimbrot (1400s–1460s), painter

Born 1401–1450 
Jacomart (c. 1410–1461), painter 
Jaume Huguet (1415–1492), painter 
Nicolás Francés (1424–1468), painter 
Luis Dalmau (1428–1461), painter 
Joan Reixach (1431–1486), painter 
Master of the Cypresses 1434, manuscript illuminator 
Bartolomé Bermejo (1440–1498), painter 
Fernando Gallego (1440–1507), painter
Rodrigo de Osona (1440–1518), painter
Antonio del Rincón (ca.1446–1500) Painter
Paolo da San Leocadio (1447–1520), painter of Italian origins
Pedro Sanchez, 15th century painter 
Pedro Berruguete (1450–1504), painter
Lo Spagna (1450–1528), painter

Born 1451–1500 
Martín Bernat (1454–1497), painter 
Juan de Flandes (1460–1519), painter 
Pedro Romana (1460–1536), painter
Francisco de Osona (1465–1514), painter
Diego López (1465–1530), painter
Gil de Siloé (1467–1505), sculptor/architect 
Juan de Borgoña (1470–1534), painter
Vasco de la Zarza (1470–1524), sculptor
Alejo Fernández (1475–1545), painter
Vicente Masip (1475–1545), painter
Fernando Yáñez de la Almedina (1475–1536), painter
Felipe Vigarny (1480–1542), sculptor 
Master of the Retablo of the Reyes Catolicos (1485–1500), painter
Alonso Berruguete 1488–1561, painter/sculptor 
Pedro Machuca (1490–1550), painter
Diego de Siloé (1495–1563), sculptor/architect
Juan Vicente Masip (1500–1579), painter

Spain
 
 
Artists